Marcus Chin On Kang (born 22 September 1953) is a Singaporean host, actor and singer. He left Mediacorp as a full-time artiste.

Career
Chin joined the Singapore Broadcasting Corporation during the 1970s. During the 1990s, he was mainly known for starring in comedic roles in the long-running Comedy Nite (搞笑行动) and various shows alongside Jack Neo, Moses Lim, Mark Lee, Henry Thia, John Cheng and Jimmy Nah.

Chin left J-Team with one year remaining on his 10-year contract after he divorced his wife, Murong Ying, to be with then-girlfriend, Eileen Cheah.

Besides acting and singing, Chin works as a deejay on Love 97.2FM.

At the Star Awards 2018, he was nominated for Best Supporting Actor for the drama,  Have A Little Faith.

Personal life
Chin married Taiwanese singer Murong Ying in 1987. They separated after Chin was discovered dating his personal assistant, Eileen Cheah, at that time.

Cheah gave birth to their daughter, Elise, in Malaysia on 18 August 2010.

Chin and Cheah broke up in 2011, a year after their daughter was born. In an interview with 8 Days in 2018, Chin revealed that he is still legally married to Murong Ying and that she still lives in their marital home. According to Chin, a divorce would mean selling their house which would leave his wife homeless. Currently, Chin lives alone in a rented apartment.

Filmography

Television

Film

Variety show

Compilation album

Awards and nominations

References

External links 
 

Singaporean people of Hakka descent
Living people
20th-century Singaporean male actors
21st-century Singaporean male actors
Singaporean television personalities
Singaporean male film actors
Singaporean male television actors
1954 births